Regional League Northern Region is the 3rd Level League in Thailand. It was formed in 2009 along with other four other regional leagues, all playing at the same level. The winner of each regional league enter the Regional League Championships to determine the three teams that will receive promotion to the Thai Division 1 League.

League History

Formed in 2009, 11 clubs applied to be part of the new setup; Chainat, Chiangmai United, Chiangrai United, Kamphaeng Phet, Phetchabun, Phichit, Phitsanulok, Phrae, Sukhothai, Tak and Uttaradit.

Chiangmai United and Phitsanulok were the only two teams with previous experience in the Thai football league system.

Chiangrai United led the league from start to finish and duly won the first championship by 14 points.

Timeline

Championship History

Member clubs

 
North
Sports leagues established in 2009
2009 establishments in Thailand